Gilia latiflora is a species of flowering plant in the phlox family known by the common names hollyleaf gilia and broad-flowered gilia. It is endemic to deserts and mountains of southern California and the adjacent margin of Nevada.

Description
Gilia latiflora adds lavender to the colorful carpet of spring wildflowers on the sandy washes of the region. The plant starts from a basal rosette of frilly leaves, each of which is made up of many narrow-toothed lobes. The stem is generally too small to notice; instead the plant is scapose, sending stemlike inflorescences directly up from the ground.

Each multibranched inflorescence is green to reddish in color and approaches half a meter in maximum height. The flowers are fragrant. The upper throat and lobe bases are white grading to lavender at the tips. Protruding from the throat are generally five stamens and one longer style.

References

External links
Gilia latiflora - Photo gallery

latiflora
Endemic flora of California
Flora of the California desert regions
Natural history of the California chaparral and woodlands
Natural history of the Mojave Desert
Natural history of the Transverse Ranges
Flora without expected TNC conservation status